Possibilism in cultural geography is the theory that the environment sets certain constraints or limitations, but culture is otherwise determined by social conditions.
In cultural ecology, Marshall Sahlins used this concept in order to develop alternative approaches to the environmental determinism dominant at that time in ecological studies. Strabo posited in 64 BC that humans can make things happen by their own intelligence over time. Strabo cautioned against the assumption that nature and actions of  humans were determined by the physical environment they inhabited. He observed that humans were the active elements in a human-environmental partnership and partnering.

The controversy between geographical possibilism and determinism might be considered one of (at least) three dominant epistemologic controversies of contemporary geography. The other two controversies are:

1) the "debate between neopositivists and neokantians about the "exceptionalism" or the specificity of geography as a science.

2) the contention between Mackinder and Kropotkin about what is—or should be—geography".

Possibilism in geography is, thus, considered a distinct approach to geographical knowledge, directly opposed to geographical determinism.

References

External links
University of Washington lecture
Valparaiso University on La Blache

Cultural geography
History of geography